The North Island, also officially named Te Ika-a-Māui, is one of the two main islands of New Zealand, separated from the larger but much less populous South Island by the Cook Strait. The world's 28th-most-populous island, and the most populous island in Polynesia, the North Island has a population of  accounting for approximately % of the total residents of New Zealand.

Twelve main urban areas (half of them officially cities) are in the North Island. From north to south, they are Whangārei, Auckland, Hamilton, Tauranga, Rotorua, Gisborne, New Plymouth, Napier, Hastings, Whanganui, Palmerston North, and New Zealand's capital city Wellington, which is located at the south-west tip of the island.

Naming and usage

Although the island has been known as the North Island for many years, in 2009 the New Zealand Geographic Board found that, along with the South Island, the North Island had no official name. After a public consultation, the board officially named the island North Island or Te Ika-a-Māui in October 2013.

In prose, the two main islands of New Zealand are called the North Island and the South Island, with the definite article.  It is also normal to use the preposition in rather than on, for example "Hamilton is in the North Island", "my mother lives in the North Island". Maps, headings, tables, and adjectival expressions use North Island without "the".

Māori mythology

According to Māori mythology, the North and South Islands of New Zealand arose through the actions of the demigod Māui. Māui and his brothers were fishing from their canoe (the South Island) when he caught a great fish and pulled it right up from the sea. While he was not looking his brothers fought over the fish and chopped it up. This great fish became the North Island and thus a Māori name for the North Island is Te Ika-a-Māui ("The Fish of Māui"). The mountains and valleys are believed to have been formed as a result of Māui's brothers' hacking at the fish. 

During Captain James Cook's voyage between 1769 and 1770, Tahitian navigator Tupaia accompanied the circumnavigation of New Zealand. The maps described the North Island as "Ea Heinom Auwe" and "Aeheinomowe", which recognises the "Fish of Māui" element. 

Another Māori name that was given to the North Island, but is now used less commonly, is Aotearoa. Use of Aotearoa to describe the North Island fell out of favour in the early 20th century and it is now a collective Māori name for New Zealand as a whole.

Geography 

During the Last Glacial Period when sea levels were over 100 metres lower than present day levels, the North and South islands were connected by a vast coastal plain which formed at the South Taranaki Bight. During this period, most of the North Island was covered in thorn scrubland and forest, while the modern-day Northland Peninsula was a subtropical rainforest. Sea levels began to rise 7,000 years ago, eventually separating the islands and linking the Cook Strait to the Tasman Sea.

Bays and coastal features
Bay of Islands
Bay of Plenty
Hauraki Gulf
Firth of Thames
Hawke Bay
Ninety Mile Beach
North Taranaki Bight
South Taranaki Bight

Lakes and rivers
Lake Taupō
Waikato River
Whanganui River

Capes and peninsulas
Coromandel Peninsula
Northland Peninsula
Cape Palliser
Cape Reinga
East Cape
North Cape

Forests and national parks

Egmont National Park
Tongariro National Park
Waipoua Kauri Forest
Whanganui National Park
and many forest parks of New Zealand

Volcanology

Auckland Volcanic Field
Mount Ruapehu
Mount Taranaki (Taranaki Maunga)
Mount Tarawera
Whakaari / White Island
North Island Volcanic Plateau

Other
Waitomo Caves
Taumatawhakatangihangakoauauotamateaturipukakapikimaungahoronukupokaiwhenuakitanatahu

Demographics 

Ever since the conclusion of the Otago Goldrush in the 1860s, New Zealand's European population growth has experienced a steady 'Northern drift' as population centres in the North Island have grown faster than those of New Zealand's South Island. This population trend has continued into the twenty-first century, but at a much slower rate. While the North Island’s population continues to grow faster than the South Island, this is solely due to the North Island having higher natural increase (i.e. births minus deaths) and international migration; since the late 1980s, the internal migration flow has been from the North Island to the South Island. In the year to June 2020, the North Island gained 21,950 people from natural increase and 62,710 people from international migration, while losing 3,570 people from internal migration.

Culture and identity 
At the 2018 New Zealand census, 65.7% of North Islanders identified as of European ethnicity, 18.5% as Māori, 17.0% as Asian, 9.7% as Pacific Islanders, 1.6% as Middle Eastern/Latin American/African, and 1.2% as another ethnicity (mainly 'New Zealander'). Totals add to more than 100% since people may identify with multiple ethnicities.

The proportion of North Islanders born overseas is 29.3%. The most common foreign countries of birth are England (15.4% of overseas-born residents), Mainland China (11.3%), India (10.1%), South Africa (5.9%), Australia (5.5%) and Samoa (5.3%).

Cities and towns

The North Island has a larger population than the South Island, with the country's largest city, Auckland, and the capital, Wellington, accounting for nearly half of it.

There are 30 urban areas in the North Island with a population of 10,000 or more:

Economy
The sub-national GDP of the North Island was estimated at US$102.863 billion in 2003, 79% of New Zealand's national GDP.

Governance

Regions 

Nine local government regions cover the North Island and its adjacent islands and territorial waters.

Northland
Auckland
Waikato
Bay of Plenty
Gisborne
Taranaki
Manawatū-Whanganui
Hawke's Bay Region
Wellington Region

Healthcare

Healthcare in the North Island is provided by fifteen District Health Boards (DHBs). Organised around geographical areas of varying population sizes, they are not coterminous with the Local Government Regions.

See also
List of islands of New Zealand

References

External links 

 
Islands of New Zealand